Ryazan Governorate (Ryazanskaya guberniya, Government of Ryazan) was an administrative division (a guberniya) of the Russian Empire and Russian Socialist Federative Soviet Republic, which existed from 1796 to 1929. Its administrative center was in the city of Ryazan.

Administrative division
Ryazan Governorate consisted of the following uyezds (administrative centres in parentheses):
 Dankovsky Uyezd (Dankov)
 Yegoryevsky Uyezd (Yegoryevsk)
 Zaraysky Uyezd (Zaraysk)
 Kasimovsky Uyezd (Kasimov)
 Mikhaylovsky Uyezd (Mikhaylov)
 Pronsky Uyezd (Pronsk)
 Ranenburgsky Uyezd (Ranenburg)
 Ryazhsky Uyezd (Ryazhsk)
 Ryazansky Uyezd (Ryazan)
 Sapozhkovsky Uyezd (Sapozhok)
 Skopinsky Uyezd (Skopin)
 Spassky Uyezd (Spassk)

References 

 
Governorates of the Russian Empire
Governorates of the Russian Soviet Federative Socialist Republic
States and territories established in 1796
States and territories disestablished in 1929
1796 establishments in the Russian Empire